Northern Parkway is a limited-access road in Maricopa County, Arizona that serves the west part of the Phoenix metropolitan area. Northern Parkway was first opened in December 2013. Northern Parkway currently ends at the Agua Fria River but is planned to extend to the US 60.

Route description
Northern Parkway begins at a trumpet interchange with Loop 303. The parkway heads east for three miles, passing through interchanges at Sarival Avenue, Reems Road, and Litchfield Road. After passing Litchfield Road, it turns southeast and proceeds along the Northern Avenue corridor. Northern Parkway then passes through the Dysart and El Mirage Roads interchanges where frontage roads accompany the parkway for this one-mile segment. East of El Mirage Road, Northern Parkway crosses the Agua Fria River where it temporarily ends. Northern Parkway is planned to replace Northern Avenue heading east from the Agua Fria River to US 60 (Grand Avenue).

History
Plans to build a limited-access road along the Northern Avenue corridor date back to 2001 when the City of Glendale found a need for a major east-west corridor between Loop 101 and Loop 303. In 2003, the Northern Parkway concept was included in Maricopa Association of Governments (MAG) regional transportation plan (RTP). A year later, residents of Maricopa County voted to extend the regional half-cent sales tax for transportation. As part of this initiative, a number of major arterial  road improvements were funded including Northern Parkway.

In 2008, Maricopa County along with the cities of Glendale, El Mirage, and Peoria approved a design concept report for the project. Roughly 70% of the project's funding will come from the federal funds allocated by MAG while the remainder coming from the four local agencies. Over $315 million has been programmed for Northern Parkway from MAG, roughly half of the projected total cost of the whole project at $615 million.

Phases 1–2
Construction on the four-mile segment between Loop 303 and Dysart Road began in March 2012 and was opened in December 2013. Construction of the overpasses at Reems and Litchfield Roads began in summer 2014 and was completed in January 2015.  With the completion of those interchanges, this four-mile segment was upgraded to freeway standards. The project stalled from 2015–2019 as Maricopa County saw less growth in this region than expected because of the Great Recession.
 
Construction resumed in early 2019 on the segment between Dysart Road and 111th Avenue. It consisted of constructing the frontage roads between Dysart and El Mirage Roads and building a new bridge above the Agua Fria River. This part was complete in August 2020. The second part of this project was to construct overpasses at Dysart and El Mirage Roads as well as build the parkway between those two roads. Construction began in June 2021 and was completed in September 2022.

Future

Phase 3
Phase 3 will be between 2023 and 2027 and the first part will be to finalize the design for this segment. The first major construction will begin in 2025, consisting of upgrading the Northern Avenue corridor to three lanes in each direction and adding a median between 111th Avenue and 99th Ave. No grade-separated interchanges will be built in this segment due to residential communities. Traffic signals will be placed at the major intersections. Other access points in this segment will be limited to right-in/right-out movements. This is expected to be complete in 2027.

The segment between 99th and 91st Avenues will be taken over by the Arizona Department of Transportation (ADOT), as Northern Parkway intersects Loop 101. The roadway will be upgraded to four lanes in each direction along with a new diverging diamond interchange (DDI) with the Loop 101. Traffic signals will also be upgraded in this section. Construction of this will be between 2025 and 2027.

The segment between 91st and Grand Avenues will be upgraded to three lanes in each direction. There will also be no grade-separated interchanges in this segment until Grand Avenue. Traffic signals will be at the major intersections and other access points will also be limited to right-in/right-out movements. A two-way flyover ramp will be constructed at Grand Avenue to move uninterrupted traffic from westbound Northern Parkway to southeast Grand Avenue and vice versa. This will be the final part of the Northern Parkway project and construction is expected to begin in 2026.
 
When complete, Northern Parkway will be  in length, stretching from Loop 303 to US 60. Northern Parkway will be an access-controlled freeway for the six-mile segment from Loop 303 through the Agua Fria River. Between the Agua Fria River and US 60, it will be an enhanced arterial street with lights at major intersections.

Major Intersections

References

External links

Freeways in the Phoenix metropolitan area
Transportation in Maricopa County, Arizona